Fisher is a village in Sabine Parish, Louisiana, United States. The population was 230 at the 2010 census, down from 268 in 2000.

History
Fisher was named for Oliver Williams Fisher and built between 1899 and 1901 by the Louisiana Long Leaf Lumber Company. It remained a company-owned sawmill town until it was sold to Boise Cascade Corporation in 1966.

Former Louisiana State Representative Cliff Ammons was the principal of Fisher High School in the late 1940s.

Geography
Fisher is located at  (31.491157, -93.460599).

Demographics

As of the census of 2000, there were 268 people, 101 households, and 72 families residing in the village. The racial makeup of the village was 65.67% White, 31.34% African American, 0.75% Native American, 1.87% from other races, and 0.37% from two or more races. Hispanic or Latino of any race were 2.24% of the population.

There were 101 households, out of which 35.6% had children under the age of 18 living with them, 58.4% were married couples living together, 9.9% had a female householder with no husband present, and 28.7% were non-families. 28.7% of all households were made up of individuals, and 7.9% had someone living alone who was 65 years of age or older. The average household size was 2.65 and the average family size was 3.29.

In the village, the population was spread out, with 30.2% under the age of 18, 8.6% from 18 to 24, 26.5% from 25 to 44, 25.7% from 45 to 64, and 9.0% who were 65 years of age or older. The median age was 36 years. For every 100 females, there were 116.1 males. For every 100 females age 18 and over, there were 98.9 males.

The median income for a household in the village was $27,708, and the median income for a family was $34,250. Males had a median income of $31,500 versus $11,875 for females. The per capita income for the village was $11,998. About 8.0% of families and 15.4% of the population were below the poverty line, including 16.4% of those under the age of eighteen and 10.5% of those 65 or over.

Education
Public schools in Sabine Parish are operated by the Sabine Parish School Board. The village of Fisher is zoned to Many Elementary School (Grades PK-3), Many Junior High School (Grades 4-8), and Many High School  (Grades 9-12).

Culture
Fisher Sawmill Days was started in 1976 and is an annual festival, that takes place the third weekend in May, and captures a glimpse of turn-of-the-last-century lumbering in Louisiana.

Notable person

John S. Pickett, Jr., state representative and state district court judge

References

External links 
ToledoBendLakeCountry.com -- Official site of the Toledo Bend (Sabine Parish) Tourist Commission

Villages in Sabine Parish, Louisiana
Villages in Louisiana